Üner is a Turkish name. Notable people with the name include:

Given name:
 Üner Kirdar, Turkish author and United Nations official
 Üner Tan, Turkish neuroscientist and evolutionary biologist

Surname:
 İdil Üner, German-Turkish actress
 Kaan Üner, Turkish basketball player

See also
 Uner Tan syndrome, syndrome proposed by the Turkish evolutionary biologist Üner Tan

Turkish-language surnames
Turkish masculine given names

de:Üner